The Alfa Romeo Tipo 312, 312 or 12C-312 was a 3-litre formula racing car that was used in the 1938 Grand Prix season; drivers were Raymond Sommer, Giuseppe Farina, Eugenio Siena, Clemente Biondetti, Carlo Pintacuda, Jean-Pierre Wimille, Gianfranco Comotti, Piero Taruffi and Pietro Ghersi.

Tipo 312 was one of three Alfa Romeo cars designed for the new rules in 1938, which differed mainly by the engine; the other two cars were the Alfa Romeo Tipo 308 with straight-8 engine and Alfa Romeo Tipo 316 with a V16 engine. The car was based on unsuccessful Alfa Romeo 12C-37; it was made easier to control than its predecessor. The engine in 312 is 3-litre 60° V-12 with roots supercharger; it was more powerful than 308 but it was still not really competitive with German rivals.

References

External links
www.racing-database.com
www.kolumbus.fi

Tipo 312
Grand Prix cars